Sweet Arms (stylized as sweet ARMS) is a Japanese voice actor unit that consists of four members. They are affiliated with Kami Records and Nippon Columbia.

History
Sweet ARMS is a voice actor unit that was formed when Upotte!! aired. The name sweet ARMS originates from adding a mix of cuteness to "Short Arms," a rifle that is a motif in Upotte!!. Afterwards, they also sang the theme song for Date A Live. Every member was originally affiliated with Production Ace, but now, every member has moved on to different agencies.

Members

Discography

Singles

Album

Song collaborations

References

External links
 
 sweet ARMS on Twitter 

Japanese vocal groups
Anime singers
Nippon Columbia artists